Ekpeye people also known as Ekpeye Kingdom (An Igbo sub group) claim to have fled Bini to settle in Rivers State, Niger Delta, Nigeria. However, they speak an igboid language  and dialect have no similarity to the aforementioned claim of migrating from Bini. Hence, they are of the Igbo extraction by dialect, culture, and every other way of life. They are predominantly found in Ahoada East and some in Ahoada West local government areas in Rivers. Ahoada is an Ekpeye city in Rivers, Nigeria.

Politics
 The Ekpeye people originated from Anioma in Delta state , Egbema in Imo state, and Igbanke an Igbo community in Edo state. These group of Igbo people migrated from the Igbo hinterland to present day River state. At the time , The Benin Empire was one of the greatest kingdoms in West Africa . The Benin Kingdom dominated some parts in Southern Nigeria. The Edo people influenced the Ekpeye people and their language. They also forced Ekpeye people to be like Binis and that they originated from the Benin Kingdom . A group of Benin influenced Igbo people migrated from Ekpeye land to what is now Ogbaland . The Ekpeye and Ogba people adopted a prince from the Benin Kingdom his name was Akalaka. In the late 1900s , the Biafran war began. The Ekpeye people sided with the Igbo in the Biafran war. After the war , The Ekpeye people began to lose their Igbo identity to a Bini Identity. That is why some Ekpeye people say they are from Benin but they are from the Igbo ethnic group

Language

The Ekpeye people speak Ekpeye language which is a dialect of Igbo language

Notes

References
 Amini-Philips, Isaac C. (1994) King Nworisa of Ekpeyeland (1830–1899): his life and times Riverside Communications, Port Harcourt, Nigeria,  ;
 Amini-Philips, Isaac C. (1998) Establishing a chronology for Ekpeye history Emhai Print. & Pub., Port Harcourt, Nigeria,  OCLC 53842667 ;
 Ekine,Gift V. (2014)- A Concise History of Ekpeyeland and People, Osia Digital Press, Port Harcourt,Nigeria
 Ekine, Gift V. (2013)- A Dictionary of Ekpeyewords and Pronunciations, Osia Digital Press, Port Harcourt, Nigeria.
Picton, John (February 1988) "Ekpeye masks and masking" African arts 21(2): pp. 46–53, 94 OCLC 40558650;
 Clark, David J. (1971) Reading and Writing Ekpeye Institute of African Studies, University of Ibadan, Ibadan, Nigeria, OCLC 2464074;
 "Ekpeye:  a language of Nigeria" Ethnologue;
 Ajugo, U. B (2005) "The True History of Ekpeyeland :3000 BC ~ 2005 AD". A BGR Project, Port Harcourt Nigeria.

Igbo subgroups
Indigenous peoples of Rivers State
Igboid languages